The 1954 Oklahoma A&M Cowboys football team represented Oklahoma Agricultural and Mechanical College (later renamed Oklahoma State University–Stillwater) in the Missouri Valley Conference during the 1954 college football season. In their fifth and final season under head coach Jennings B. Whitworth, the Cowboys compiled a 5–4–1 record (2–2 against conference opponents), finished in third place in the conference, and outscored opponents by a combined total of 161 to 119.

On offense, the 1954 team averaged 16.1 points scored, 229.3 rushing yards, and 56.5 passing yards per game.  On defense, the team allowed an average of 11.9 points scored, 163.0 rushing yards and 68.8 passing yards per game. The team's statistical leaders included fullback Earl Lunsford with 761 rushing yards and 54 points scored, Fred Duvall with 195 passing yards, and Chester Spencer with 119 receiving yards.

Two Oklahoma A&M players received first-team All-Missouri Valley Conference honors: end Bob LaRue and tackle Dale Meinert.

The team played its home games at Lewis Field in Stillwater, Oklahoma.

Schedule

After the season

The 1955 NFL Draft was held on January 27–28, 1955. The following Cowboys were selected.

References

Oklahoma AandM
Oklahoma State Cowboys football seasons
Oklahoma AM